The R499 road is a regional road in Ireland which runs southwest-northeast from the R445 7 km east of Birdhill, County Tipperary, rejoining the R445 in Toomevara, County Tipperary.

See also
Roads in Ireland
National primary road
National secondary road

References
Roads Act 1993 (Classification of Regional Roads) Order 2006 – Department of Transport

Regional roads in the Republic of Ireland
Roads in County Tipperary